Gutkowice-Nowiny  is a village in the administrative district of Gmina Żelechlinek, within Tomaszów Mazowiecki County, Łódź Voivodeship, in central Poland.

References

Gutkowice-Nowiny